Marie Albe (29 May 1924 – 5 January 2021) was a French actress and journalist. She attended the University of Provence.

Journalism
Albe worked for Radio Monte Carlo from 1952 to 1960, and subsequently, Radio France and France 3 Provence-Alpes.

Filmography

Cinema
Alone in the World (1952)
Le Curé de Ballargue (1952)
Le Club des 400 coups (1953)
Napoleon Road (1953)
Le Secret de sœur Angèle (1956)
Le Naïf aux quarante enfants (1957)
Les Fleurs de glai (1974)
The Horseman on the Roof (1995)
Nos amis les flics (2004)

Television
La Bastide blanche (1997)
Un étrange héritage (1997)
L'Inventaire (1998)
Le Châtiment du Makhila (2001)
L'Arbre et l'Oiseau (2005)
Le Maître qui laissait les enfants rêver (2007)
Le Sang des Atrides (2010)

References

1924 births
2021 deaths
French actresses
French women journalists
University of Provence alumni
People from Soissons